Downtown is a 1990 American buddy cop action comedy film directed by Richard Benjamin. The film starred Anthony Edwards, Forest Whitaker, Penelope Ann Miller and Joe Pantoliano.

Plot

Police Officer Alex Kearney is a patrolman in Bryn Mawr, an affluent, plush suburb of Philadelphia--until he stops an important businessman and his account of the incident is not believed. As punishment, he is assigned to work Downtown, considered the most dangerous, high-crime precinct in the city. Everyone at the precinct is certain that the 'by the book' suburban, pampered cop is going to get himself (and whoever is assigned as his partner), killed.

Sergeant Dennis Curren draws the unfortunate 'babysitting' assignment. However, when Alex's best friend is killed investigating a stolen car, Alex throws the book out the window tracking down the killer.

Cast
 Anthony Edwards as Officer Alex Kearney 
 Forest Whitaker as Sergeant Dennis Curren 
 Penelope Ann Miller as Lori Mitchell 
 Joe Pantoliano as White
 David Clennon as Jerome Sweet
 Art Evans as Henry Coleman 
 Rick Aiello as Mickey Witlin
 Roger Aaron Brown as Lieutenant Sam Parral 
 Ron Canada as Lowell Harris 
 Wanda De Jesus as Luisa Diaz
 Francis X. McCarthy as Inspector Ben Glass (credited as Frank McCarthy)
 Kimberly Scott as Christine Curren
 Danuel Pipoly as Skip Markowitz
 Ron Taylor as Bruce Tucker
 Vinnie Curto as Mr. Lopez

Production
Though the plot of the movie references a Philadelphia suburb, Bryn Mawr, most of the exterior filming is done within the City of Philadelphia. The beginning of the film features Cresheim Valley Road, Stenton, and Germantown Avenues. This is in the Mount Airy and Chestnut Hill neighborhoods.

There are a few early scenes that are filmed in and around Los Angeles. The scene where Anthony Edwards pretends to pull over Penelope Ann Miller is filmed on Yale Street, in Claremont, CA. Later portions of the film are in the Fairhill and Norris Square neighborhoods which are now known as "The Badlands" circa 2000. Diamond Street is within this area, but Philadelphia police districts are numbered, not named for streets or neighborhoods.

Reception 
The film received mostly negative reviews. Hal Hinson of The Washington Post called the film racist for picturing "the inner city as an all-black criminal hell-town where the men who walk the streets are much less human than the people in the all-white suburbs." David Nusair of Reel Films called it "[r]elentlessly bland and hopelessly unfunny."

References

External links
 
 
 
 
 

1990 films
1990s action comedy-drama films
1990s crime comedy-drama films
20th Century Fox films
American action comedy-drama films
American buddy cop films
American crime comedy-drama films
Films directed by Richard Benjamin
Films set in Philadelphia
Films scored by Alan Silvestri
1990s police comedy films
Fictional portrayals of the Philadelphia Police Department
Buddy comedy films
1990s buddy cop films
1990 comedy films
1990 drama films
1990s English-language films
1990s American films